Fielding Lake is an Alaskan lake adjacent to the Richardson Highway,  north of Isabel Pass in the Alaska Range. As an alpine lake, it freezes early in autumn, and ice can remain on portions of the lake as late as July. The lake has good fishing for grayling, burbot and trout, all of which are native populations and not stocked. The lake bottom is mud and gravel, with heavy vegetation in shallow areas. The area around the lake is described as "barren, rolling tundra".  The entirety of the lake itself is public, but some areas of the shore are private property.

Park
The park and the lake itself are above the tree line and are considered to be under "passive management".

References

Lakes of Alaska